Panayot Hristov Pipkov (21 November 1871 – 25 August 1942) was a Bulgarian composer. He studied music in Milan, Italy, and taught in Lovech and Sofia. He was the father of composer Lyubomir Pipkov.

Honours
Pipkov Glacier in Antarctica is named after Panayot Pipkov and Lyubomir Pipkov.

References

1871 births
1942 deaths
Bulgarian composers